D-Fuse are a London-based audiovisual artist collective, who use emerging creative technologies to explore social and environmental issues.

Background
Founded in the mid 1990s by Michael Faulkner, the group's diverse creative backgrounds combine in a cross-disciplinary practice, including live multi-screen audio-visual performances, experimental documentary, photography, and temporary architectural installations.   Since the mid 1990s, the line up has included Stuart Gill, Ian Masters (Pale Saints), Joanna Buick, Andy Stiff, Axel Stockburger, Matthias Kispert, Barney Steel, and Toby Harris.

Widely recognised as pioneers of VJ culture, D-Fuse edited the book VJ: Audiovisual Art + VJ Culture in 2006.  Their current practice includes live multi-screen audio-visual performances, experimental documentary, HD shorts, and the temporary architecture of installations.  Now at the forefront of the emerging genre of Live Cinema, the key relationship between sound and image underpins all of D-Fuse's work.

Sound Director Matthias Kispert composes soundscapes from field recordings, electromagnetic interferences and different musical cultures, building a material link between the sounds of everyday life and D-Fuse's visual work.

D-Fuse's urban investigations are inspired by psychogeography, and aim to highlight some of the social and environmental conflicts that arise in living spaces shared by a large number of people, while also leaving room for the personal and emotive aspects of life in the city. The video Brilliant City [2004] and the live cinema performances Latitude [2007], Particle [2009], and Endless Cities [ongoing] all present different views of contemporary metropolises and the population shifts and spatial transformations that are taking place there.

A collaborative ethos is central to D-Fuse's practice, and has led to joint projects with musicians and artists from the electronic to the classical.  Among them are Beck, Scanner, Burnt Friedman and Swayzak, as well as the contemporary classical composer Steve Reich with The London Symphony Orchestra, and the Italian classical ensemble Alter Ego.

Whilst working primarily as audio visual artists on self initiated projects, D-Fuse have also led commercial projects for Apple, Sony, BMW, Nokia, and DoCoMo, including commercials, online and mobile content, performances and installations.

D-Fuse work with live music and art institutions around the world, incl. BFI and The V&A Museum (London), Sonar (Barcelona), onedotzero festivals, Mori Arts Center (Tokyo), San Francisco Museum of Modern Art, TriBeca Film Festival (New York City), Sundance Film Festival, LA Film Festival, Eyebeam (New York City), Barbican (London), ISEA (Belfast), Nokia Labs (St Petersburg and Moscow), Ars Electronica (Linz), Rotterdam, Seoul and Milan Film Festivals, Lisbon Biennale, Valencia Biennale, MU Gallery (Eindhoven), Get It Louder (China), The Big Chill Festival (London), FILE (São Paulo), ON_OFF (São Paulo), German Gymnasium (London), Leeds and Reading Music Festivals, Edinburgh International Film Festival, Live Earth, Kinetica Art Fair, CineCity (Brighton), Lovebytes (Sheffield), MIC Toi Rerehiko (Auckland), CynetArt (Dresden), Cimatics Festival (Brussels), International Short Film Festival (Rio de Janeiro), Freewaves (Los Angeles), Icebox (Cape Town), Hipersonica (São Paulo), Duolun Museum of Modern Art (Shanghai), Plasma (Florence), Lothringer Dreizehn (Munich).

Releases
DVD VIDEO
D-Fuse vs Nonplace (2002) Nowonmedia - Japan 
D-Fuse Retrospective 2000-2003 (2003) Gas - Japan 
D-Tonate_00 (2003) Nowonmedia - Japan 
D-Tonate_00 (2004) onedotzero - UK

DVD AUDIO/DVD VIDEO
Beck Guero - Interscope (2005)

BOOKS
VJ: Audiovisual Art and VJ Culture - Laurence King

Compilations
Endeka: Fluid onedotzero_select DVD1 (2003) onedotzero 
Sprawl Mix: Si-{cut}.db and Bittonic  Mixmasters - Episode 4 / The Audiovisual Sessions (2004) Moonshine - US 
Data_Flow: L'Usine Microscope Session DVD 2.0 - New Cooperations in Sound and Visuals (2005) DS-X.org - Germany
Light Turned Down: Scanner, Experimenta 01: Burnt Friedman Gas TV-05 Moving Image of London (2005) Gas - Japan 
Xenon: Ben Sheppee - D-Fuse remix Lightrhythm Visuals - Singles 06-10 (2004) Lightrhythmvisuals 
Hidden Partition (2005) Lightrhythmvisuals 
Data_Flow: L'Usine [Version] Reline 2 (2006) Microcinema - US

References

External links
 www.dfuse.com
 Films on Vimeo
 Film on Dfuse
 A Visualist Documentary

British artist groups and collectives
Audiovisual artists